Mahvash Shafaei (born 15 May 1956) is a retired Iranian foil fencer. In 1973 she became the first Iranian woman to win a gold medal at the Asian Fencing Championships. Next year she won two medals at the 1974 Asian Games. She placed 45th and 9th in the individual and team events at the 1976 Summer Olympics, respectively. 

Shafaei was born in a fencing family. Her elder brother Manouchehr competed internationally and coached Mahvash.

References

External links
 

1956 births
Living people
Iranian female foil fencers
Olympic fencers of Iran
Fencers at the 1976 Summer Olympics
Asian Games gold medalists for Iran
Asian Games silver medalists for Iran
Asian Games medalists in fencing
Fencers at the 1974 Asian Games
Medalists at the 1974 Asian Games
20th-century Iranian women
21st-century Iranian women